"Something to Talk About" is a song written by Canadian singer-songwriter Shirley Eikhard and recorded by American singer Bonnie Raitt for her 1991 album Luck of the Draw. It was released to US radio on June 3, 1991. Two single versions were released: a 7-inch single with the B-side "One Part Be My Lover" and a 12-inch single with these two songs and "I Ain’t Gonna Let You Break My Heart Again". In turn, this song was included on the EP version of Raitt’s 2000 single of "The Fundamental Things" taken from her 1998 album Fundamental. It was also included in 2003’s greatest hits compilation The Best of Bonnie Raitt. Live versions appear on 1995's Road Tested and 2006's Bonnie Raitt and Friends.

Background
Anne Murray wanted to record this song in 1985, but her producers did not think it would be a hit. She still called the album that she released that year Something to Talk About even though it did not include this song.

Chart performance
The song was popular on multiple formats of radio: it peaked at number 5 on the US Billboard Adult Contemporary chart, number 12 on the Album Rock Tracks chart, and number 5 on the Hot 100, becoming her highest-charting hit and is her only single to reach the top 10 on the chart. It was also a success in Canada, where it rose to number 3 on the RPM Top Singles chart, and in New Zealand, where it reached number 33.

Music video
The video for the song was directed by Matt Mahurin. It features Raitt with two guitarists performing the song at a community event, while other scenes show older couples dancing, people in silly wardrobe acting goofy for a film crew, and many people in a swimming pool.

Nominations and awards
Raitt won the Grammy Award for Best Female Pop Vocal Performance at the Grammy Awards of 1992 for her recording of this song (Oleta Adams, Mariah Carey, Amy Grant and Whitney Houston were the other finalists).  The track also received a nomination for Record of the Year, losing to "Unforgettable" by Nat King Cole and Natalie Cole.

Charts

Weekly charts

Year-end charts

Cover versions

"Something to Talk About" was utilized as the theme for the 1995 sitcom Women of the House (CBS-TV): this version was sung by the song's composer Shirley Eikhard.

In 2007, the country music group SHeDAISY recorded a cover of "Something to Talk About" for the soundtrack to the film The Guardian.

The song has been performed numerous times on American Idol, including by Kimberly Caldwell in season 2, Fantasia Barrino in season 3, Kellie Pickler in season 5 and Sanjaya Malakar in season 6. Sanjaya changed "how about love" from the chorus to "other than hair" during his farewell performance.

David Cross and Jon Benjamin perform a live duet on the 2007 DVD The Comedians Of Comedy: Live at the Troubadour.
It was sung by Will Ferrell in the 2008 film Step Brothers and also featured in the 1995 film Something to Talk About starring Julia Roberts and Dennis Quaid.

Also, in 2008, the song was covered by Daryl Hall on his video podcast show, Live From Daryl's House with special guest, KT Tunstall.

In August 2017, Britney Spears covered the song during her Las Vegas residency show Britney: Piece of Me.

References

1991 singles
1991 songs
Bonnie Raitt songs
Capitol Records singles
Grammy Award for Best Female Pop Vocal Performance
Song recordings produced by Don Was
Songs written by Shirley Eikhard